Felixstowe International College is an independent school founded in 1995 in Felixstowe, Suffolk, England.

See also
List of schools in Suffolk

References

Private schools in Suffolk
Felixstowe
Educational institutions established in 1995
1995 establishments in England